Pollachi Junction (station code: POY) is a historical railway junction serving the town of Pollachi, Tamil Nadu. This station is a part of the Palakkad railway division of Southern Railway Zone. After the division of Madurai division into 2, namely Salem division. It is being a part of PGT railway division.

History
Pollachi Junction was first used as a train station for trade in the 1850s. After 1900, it was used as a station for passengers.

The first service started in 1915 from Pollachi to Podanur line as metre-gauge section. In 2008, the station was closed for the gauge conversion of the Dindigul–Podanur.

On 25 November 2014, CRS successfully completed a speed trial and inspection along the Pollachi–Palani broad-gauge line. After seven years of construction, Pollachi Junction–Palani broad-gauge line was opened for commercial use on 9 January 2015.

The old metre-gauge track on the stretch was in use for 110 years, from 1898 until it was closed in 2008 for the conversion.

On 6 October 2015, CRS successfully completed a speed trial and Inspection on the Palakkad Town–Pollachi Junction broad-gauge line. The distance of 54 km was covered in 38 minutes by CRS Special Train. The line was opened for commercial use on 16 November 2015.

On 24 March 2017, CRS successfully completed a speed trial and inspection along the Podanur–Pollachi broad-gauge line.

Electrification between Pollachi(incl) Jn and Podanur Jn(excl) has been successfully completed and speed trial conducted on 20 September 2021 successfully and The Commissioner of Railway Safety approved the line for Passenger Traffic.

Electrification between Pollachi Jn(excl) and Palghat Town(excl) also completed along with Pollachi and Palani Sector.

Electrification between Palani(excl) and Dindigul Jn(excl) also completed and now the Entire DG-POY-PGT/PTJ(CBE) has become FESL (Fully Electrified Single Line) Section, Trains like CHENNAI-PALAKKAD and TRIVANDRUM-MADURI Expresses are running on Electric Traction end-end.

Lines
The station is a junction formed by the intersection of three single lines:

Dindigul via Udumalapettai, Palani and Oddanchatram.
Coimbatore via Kinathukadavu, Chettipalayam, and podanur.
 via Meenachipuram, Muthalamada, Kollengode, Pudunagaram, and Palakkad Town station.

Services
Two express trains run from the Pollachi Junction connecting the state capitals of Tamil Nadu and Kerala, namely CHENNAI-PALAKKAD Express and  TRIVANDRUM - MADURAI Amrita express respectively, operating as regular trains since November 2017.

Regular Trains
 22651	- PALAKKAD EXP	via Palakkad Town. Arrived:07:52	Departure:07:55
 22652	- PGT-MAS EXPRESS via Palani, Dindigul, Karur, Salem, Katpadi, Arakonam. Arrival:17:12	Departure:17:15
 16371 - Palakkad - Tiruchendur Exp. (Unreserved) via Palakkad Town, Pollachi, Palani, Dindigul, Madurai, Virudhunagar, Kovilpatti, Tirunelveli. Arrived: 7:08 A.M. Departure: 7:10 A.M.
 16372 - Tiruchendur - Palakkad Exp. (Unreserved) via Palakkad Town. Arrived: 19:58  Departure: 20:00
 06419 - CBE-POY EXP SPL. (Unreserved) via Kinathukadavu, Podanur. Arrival: 19:45 except (Sat)
 06420 - POY-CBE EXP SPL. (Unreserved) via Podanur, Kinathukadavu. Departure: 07:25 except (Sun)
 16343 - TVC-MDU AMRITHA EXP Via Palani, Dindigul. Arrival: 05:37 Departure: 05:40
 16344 - MDU-TVC AMRITHA EXPRESS Via Palakkad, Thrissur, Ernakulam. Arrival:19.37. Departure:19:40
 16721	- CBE MDU INTERCITY	(Unreserved) via Udumalai, Palani, Oddanchatram, Dindigul Arrival:15:28	Departure:15:30	
 16722	- MDU CBE INTERCITY	(Unreserved) via Kinathukadavu, Podanur Arrival:10:48	Departure:10:53

Weekly Specials
 06030	- TEN-MTP SPL	via Kinathukadavu, Podanur, Coimbatore Arrival:04:45	Departure:04:47 (Friday only)
 06029	- MTP-TEN SPL	Palani, Dindigul, Madurai, Virudhunagar, Rajapalayam, Thenkasi. Arrived:22:03	Departure:22:05 (Friday Only)

References

External links
 Indiarailinfo

Railway stations in Coimbatore district
Palakkad railway division
Railway junction stations in Tamil Nadu
Palakkad–Pollachi line